Kenneth Norman Belanger (born May 14, 1974) is a Canadian former professional ice hockey forward. He played in the National Hockey League (NHL) with the Toronto Maple Leafs, New York Islanders, Boston Bruins, and Los Angeles Kings from 1994 to 2005.

Playing career
Born in Sault Ste. Marie, Ontario, Belanger started his National Hockey League career with the Toronto Maple Leafs in 1994. He also played for the New York Islanders, Boston Bruins, and Los Angeles Kings. He retired a month into the 2005–06 NHL season. Belanger lives in Sault Ste. Marie Ontario and runs his own hockey school.

Career statistics

References

External links
 

1974 births
Living people
Adirondack Frostbite players
Boston Bruins players
Canadian ice hockey left wingers
Guelph Storm players
Hartford Whalers draft picks
Ice hockey people from Ontario
Kentucky Thoroughblades players
Los Angeles Kings players
New York Islanders players
Ottawa 67's players
Providence Bruins players
St. John's Maple Leafs players
Sportspeople from Sault Ste. Marie, Ontario
Toronto Maple Leafs players